The 1996 BPR 4 Hours of Anderstorp was the sixth round of the 1996 BPR Global GT Series season.

Results
Class winners in bold. Cars failing to complete 75% of winner's distance marked as Not Classified (NC).

External links
 Race results

Bpr 4 Hours Of Anderstorp, 1996
Anderstorp